Eresiomera magnimacula is a butterfly in the family Lycaenidae. It is found in Cameroon, the Republic of the Congo, the Democratic Republic of the Congo (Lualaba, Ituri, North Kivu and Uele) and Uganda (the Budongo Forest). The habitat consists of forests.

References

Butterflies described in 1914
Poritiinae